The Sutherland Steam Mill Museum is a restored steam woodworking mill from the 1890s located in Denmark, Nova Scotia. The mill operated until 1958. Today it is part of the Nova Scotia Museum system.

The museum represents the transition from water powered mills, such as that preserved at the nearby Balmoral Grist Mill Museum, to the more powerful and efficient steam-driven mill. The mill was located in at the centre of a vast woodland area and was situated next to a railroad. Thus it had excellent access to both raw materials and to markets though shipping terminals at Pictou and Wallace. At its peak, the mill employed more than a dozen workers, and it produced sawn lumber, sleds and carriages, sashes and doors and other architectural products such as gingerbread trim. The founder of the mill, Alexander Sutherland retired in 1940 and his son and successor Wilfred Sutherland retired in 1958. The mill became a museum in 1970 and it was adopted into the Nova Scotia Museum Complex in 1975.

The museum lies next to the Shortline Railbed section of the Trans-Canada Trail. The Museum offers free bike loans for day use on the trail. It also offers free woodworking space within the museum.

References
Sources
Barbara Robertson, Sawpower: Making Lumber in the Sawmills of Nova Scotia, Halifax, Nimbus Publishing and the Nova Scotia Museum (1986), pages 129–132.

Notes

External links

Sutherland Steam Mill Museum
Sutherland Steam Mill Museum on Facebook.com

Museums in Colchester County
History museums in Nova Scotia
Technology museums in Canada
Nova Scotia Museum
Steam museums